Castaic Lake (Chumash: Kaštiq) is a reservoir formed by Castaic Dam on Castaic Creek, in the Sierra Pelona Mountains of northwestern Los Angeles County, California, United States, near the town of Castaic.

The California Office of Environmental Health Hazard Assessment has issued a safety advisory for any fish caught in Castaic Lake and Castaic Lagoon due to elevated levels of mercury and PCBs.

Description
Castaic Lake is bisected by the Elderberry Forebay Dam, which creates the adjacent Elderberry Forebay. The aqueduct water comes from Pyramid Lake through the Angeles Tunnel and is used to power Castaic Power Plant, a pumped-storage hydroelectric facility on the northern end of the forebay. Water is mostly powering the turbines, rather than being pumped by them.

Castaic Lake State Recreation Area

Castaic Lake State Recreation Area is a state park located in northwestern Los Angeles County near the community of Castaic, north of Santa Clarita.  It is controlled by the California Department of Parks and Recreation.  The recreational area is adjacent to the Angeles National Forest.  The  park was established in 1965.  The area encompasses Castaic Lake.   Primary access is via Interstate 5 at exits 176A and 176B at the town of Castaic.

Distribution
Water from the lake is distributed throughout the northern portion of the Greater Los Angeles Area. Some water is released into Castaic Lagoon below the dam, to maintain its water level for recreation. Castic Lagoon drains into Castaic Creek, which flows south until it meets the Santa Clara River, a few miles west of Santa Clarita.

Lake activities 
Castaic Lake has a lower lagoon with a swim beach that is open from Memorial Day weekend to Labor Day weekend annually. This lake also offers bass fishing in the upper and lower lake year-round and float tube fishing in the lower lake.

In popular culture 
Castaic Lake was one of the main filming locations for the Mighty Morphin Power Rangers series. Many of the action scenes were recorded here.

Castaic Lake was the starting point for The Amazing Race 26 on November 12, 2014. NBC's Fear Factor was also shot there.

See also
 List of dams and reservoirs in California
 List of lakes in California
 List of largest reservoirs of California

References

External links 

 Castaic Lake State Recreation Area
  
 Castaic Lake State Recreation Area

Reservoirs in Los Angeles County, California
California State Water Project
Sierra Pelona Ridge
Reservoirs in California
Reservoirs in Southern California